Keith (also known as Keiths and Keiths Mills) is an unincorporated community in Noble County, in the U.S. state of Ohio.

History
Keith had its start around 1835 when Peter Keith and his partner opened a store. Peter Keith later also built a sawmill and gristmill in the town which bears his name. A post office was established at Keith in 1837, and remained in operation until 1904.

References

Unincorporated communities in Noble County, Ohio
Unincorporated communities in Ohio